Lichenophanes is a genus of horned powder-post beetles in the family Bostrichidae. There are more than 40 described species in Lichenophanes.

Species
These 42 species belong to the genus Lichenophanes:

 Lichenophanes albicans Lesne, 1899
 Lichenophanes angustus (Casey, 1898)
 Lichenophanes arizonicus Fisher, 1950
 Lichenophanes armiger (LeConte, 1866)
 Lichenophanes bechyneorum Vrydagh, 1959
 Lichenophanes bedeli (Lesne, 1895)
 Lichenophanes bicornis (Weber, 1801)
 Lichenophanes californicus (Horn, 1878)
 Lichenophanes carinipennis (Lewis, 1896)
 Lichenophanes caudatus (Lesne, 1895)
 Lichenophanes collarti Vrydagh, 1959
 Lichenophanes corticeus Lesne, 1908
 Lichenophanes egenus Lesne, 1923
 Lichenophanes egregius Lesne, 1934
 Lichenophanes fasciatus (Lesne, 1895)
 Lichenophanes fascicularis (Fåhraeus, 1871)
 Lichenophanes fasciculatus (Fall, 1909)
 Lichenophanes funebris Lesne, 1938
 Lichenophanes indutus Lesne, 1935
 Lichenophanes iniquus (Lesne, 1895)
 Lichenophanes insignitus (Fairmaire, 1883)
 Lichenophanes katanganus Lesne, 1935
 Lichenophanes kunckeli (Lesne, 1895)
 Lichenophanes marmoratus Lesne, 1899
 Lichenophanes martini Lesne, 1899
 Lichenophanes morbillosus (Quedenfeldt, 1887)
 Lichenophanes mutchleri (Casey, 1898)
 Lichenophanes numida Lesne, 1899
 Lichenophanes oberthuri Lesne, 1899
 Lichenophanes penicillatus (Lesne, 1895)
 Lichenophanes percristatus Lesne, 1924
 Lichenophanes perrieri Lesne, 1899
 Lichenophanes plicatus (Guérin-Méneville, 1844)
 Lichenophanes rutilans Reichardt, 1970
 Lichenophanes spectabilis (Lesne, 1895)
 Lichenophanes tristis (Fåhraeus, 1871)
 Lichenophanes truncaticollis (LeConte, 1866)
 Lichenophanes tuberosus Lesne, 1934
 Lichenophanes varius (Illiger, 1801)
 Lichenophanes verrucosus (Gorham, 1883)
 Lichenophanes weissi Lesne, 1908
 Lichenophanes zanzibaricus Lesne, 1925

References

Further reading

External links

 

Bostrichidae
Articles created by Qbugbot